The 1952 Pittsburgh Panthers football team represented the University of Pittsburgh in the 1952 college football season.  The team compiled a 6–3 record under head coach Red Dawson.

Schedule

References

Pittsburgh Panthers
Pittsburgh Panthers football seasons
Pittsburgh Panthers football